Kilmister is a surname of English origin. People with that surname include:

 Clive W. Kilmister (19242010), British mathematician who specialised in the mathematical foundations of physics
 Ian Fraser Kilmister (better known as Lemmy, 19452015), English bass-player, singer, and songwriter who founded and fronted the rock band Motörhead
 Wally Kilmister (190873), New Zealand speedway rider

See also